This is the list of Paralympic records in track cycling.

Men's records
 denotes a performance that is also a current world record.  Statistics are correct as of 22 October 2022.

Women's records
 denotes a performance that is also a current world record.  Statistics are correct as of 22 October 2022.

Mixed records
 denotes a performance that is also a current world record.  Statistics are correct as of 28 August 2021.

References

External links
 Paralympic Records – Men
 Paralympic Records – Women

Cycling
records
Track cycling records
Paralympic Games